William Bennett Munro (5 January 1875 – 4 September 1957) was a Canadian historian and political scientist. He taught at Harvard University and the California Institute of Technology. He was known for research on the seigneurial system in New France and on municipal administration in the United States.

Name Removal at Cal Tech 
In February 2021, Caltech decided to take William B. Munro's name off one of its buildings because he supported and practiced eugenics, which is a belief that certain people are better than others based on their genes on a scientific and racial level. The building was called the Division of Humanities and Social Sciences, but it was renamed the Hameetman Center. Caltech made this decision as part of an effort to recognize and address its past connection to eugenics, which has hurt many people through discrimination and damage to marginalized communities. The president of Caltech, Thomas F. Rosenbaum, said that removing Munro's name reflects the university's commitment to including everyone and recognizing its institutional history.

Munro was an advocate for eugenics, a now-discredited theory that aimed to improve the genetic quality of the human population through selective breeding and sterilization. Munro argued that the "superior" races should have more children and the "inferior" races should have fewer children, and he supported laws that allowed for involuntary sterilization.

While Munro's legacy is complicated by his support of eugenics, he also made contributions to the field of political science. He authored several books and articles on political theory, international relations, and American government, and he served as president of the American Political Science Association in 1940.

Works
1900 The droit de banalité during the French régime in Canada
1904 The Revolution
1905 "Canada and British North America. The history of North America, vol. 11
1906 "The office of intendant in New France: a study in French Colonial policy". In: The American Historical Review, Volume 12, no. 1, October 1906.
1907 Some Merits and Defects of the French Colonial System
1907 The Galveston Plan of City Government
1907 The seigniorial system in Canada : a study in French colonial policy
1908 Documents Relating to Seigneurial Tenure in Canada, 1598–1894, as part of the Champlain Society's General Series 
1909 "The custom of Paris in the New World", excerpted from Juristische Festgabe des Auslandes zu Joseph Kohlers 60. Geburtstag, Stuttgart, 1909
1912 The Initiative, Referendum and Recall
1914 Selections from the Federalist, edited with an introd. by William Bennett Munro
1915 A Bibliography of Municipal Government in the United States
1915 The seigneurs of old Canada : a chronicle of New-World feudalism
1918 Crusaders of New France: a chronicle of the Fleur-de-lis in the wilderness
1919 Public Ownership of Public Utilities 1919, with Samuel Orace Dunn, John Martin, and Delos Franklin Wilcox
1919 Government of the United States (5 editions, 2 title changes through 1946)
1926 A selected bibliography on municipal government in Great Britain
1927 The Money Power in Politics
1927 The Resurgence of Autocracy
1928 The Invisible Government, and Personality in Politics
1929 American Influences on Canadian Government
1930 American Government To-day
1931 The Government of Europe: Supplement
1932 The Significance of Our State and Local Elections
1932 The Government of European Cities
1934 Municipal Administration
1935 The New Philippine Commonwealth

References 

 Damien-Claude Bélanger, "William Bennett Munro". In: Biographies of prominent Quebec and Canadian historical figures, Marianopolis College, 2004
 Harvey Eagleson, "William Bennett Munro". In: Engineering and Science, Jan. 1960, p. 31–36

External links
 
 
 
 
 William Munro's Compilation of Seigneurial Documents, Champlain Society

1875 births
1957 deaths
Canadian eugenicists
Canadian social scientists
20th-century Canadian historians
People from Almonte, Ontario
Harvard University faculty
California Institute of Technology faculty
Canadian expatriates in the United States